Liana Mikaele-Tu'u (born 2 March 2002) is a New Zealand rugby union player. She plays for the Black Ferns internationally and was a member of their 2021 Rugby World Cup champion squad. She also plays for Blues Women in the Super Rugby Aupiki competition. She played for Hawke's Bay previously before moving to Auckland.

Rugby career 
Mikaele-Tu’u attended Hastings Girls High School and debuted for Hawke's Bay in the Farah Palmer Cup in 2019. She moved to Auckland in 2020 to study physiotherapy at university and currently plays for Auckland.

2021 
Mikaele-Tu'u played for the Blues against the Chiefs in the first-ever women's Super Rugby match in New Zealand on 1 May 2021.

Mikaele-Tu'u made her Black Ferns test debut against England in Exeter on 31 October. On 3 November, She was named in the Blues squad for the inaugural Super Rugby Aupiki competition.

2022 
Mikaele-Tu'u was named in the Blues starting line up for their first game against Matatū, they won 21–10. She also started in their 0–35 thrashing by the Chiefs Manawa in the final round.

Mikaele-Tu’u was named in the Black Ferns squad for the 2022 Pacific Four Series. She made the team once again for the deferred 2021 Rugby World Cup that was hosted by New Zealand. She scored a try for the Black Ferns as they thrashed Scotland 57–0 in their final pool game.

Personal life 
Her brother is Highlanders loose forward Marino Mikaele-Tu’u.

References

External links 

 Black Ferns Profile

2002 births
Living people
New Zealand women's international rugby union players
New Zealand female rugby union players